Carolyn Marks Blackwood (born August 21, 1951) is an American fine art photographer, film producer, writer, screenwriter, and singer-songwriter. Born in Anchorage, Alaska, Blackwood moved to New York State as a child, and finally to the Hudson Valley region of New York in 1999.

Blackwood co-owns Magnolia Mae Films with her business partner Gabrielle Tana, and is best known for her work on the Academy Award-winning film The Duchess and on the Oscar-nominated film Philomena. In addition to her work on Coriolanus, The Invisible Woman, and the 2016 Sergei Polunin documentary Dancer, she is currently active with the upcoming film The White Crow and in pre-production for My Zoe: the story of "a geneticist recovering from a toxic marriage [who] is raising her only daughter Zoe in conjunction with her ex-husband," which was released in 2019.

Blackwood's photography has been featured in solo and group exhibitions in Brussels, Los Angeles, New York City, and across the Northeastern United States, in addition to several book covers.

Film and television

Photography
Blackwood's photographic work is presently represented by Von Lintel Gallery in Los Angeles and the Roberto Polo Gallery in Brussels. Blackwood was named as one of the "five artists to watch" in the photography edition of Artnet News.

Solo exhibitions
  On the River, Lascano Gallery, Great Barrington, MA (2007)
 Let it Be in Sight of Thee, Hudson Opera House, Hudson, NY (2009)
 Let it Be in Sight of Thee, Hudson Opera House, Hudson, NY (2009)
 The Wind Blows Through the Doors of My Heart, Alan Klotz Gallery, New York, NY (2011)
 Solid, Liquid, Gas, Alan Klotz Gallery, New York, NY (2013)
 Strange Beauty, Mattatuck Museum, Waterbury, CT (2013)
 The Elements of Place, Albany Institute of History and Art, Albany, NY (2014)
 Adrift, Bard College, Annandale-on-Hudson, NY (2015)
 On the Edge, Von Lintel Gallery, Los Angeles, CA (2015)
 The Story Series, Roberto Polo Gallery, Brussels, Belgium (2017); Von Lintel Gallery (2018)
 The Story Series, Blanca Berlin Gallery, Madrid, Spain (2019)

Selected group exhibitions
 The Magic Hour, Paul Rodgers/9W Gallery, New York, NY (curated by Barbara Rose) (2007)
 The Art Show, Morton Memorial Library, Rhinecliff, NY (2007)
 A Winter's Bounty, Alan Klotz Gallery, New York, NY (2008)
 Hudson River Contemporary, Boscobel House and Gardens, Garrison, NY (2011)
 Seeing the Hudson, Alan Klotz Gallery, New York, NY Costa Nostra, Alan Klotz Gallery, New York, NY (2011)
 On Time and Place: Celebrating Scenic Hudson's 50 Years (2013)
 Urbanism, Carrie Haddad Gallery, Hudson, NY (2013)
 Here and Now: 80 Years of Photography at the Mint, Mint Museum, Charlotte, NC (2016)
 Elemental Perspectives: Land, Sea and Sky, Adamson Gallery, Washington D.C. (2016)
 Primary Forces, Nailya Alexander Gallery, New York, NY (2016)
 That Old School Dystopia, Theodore Art, Brooklyn, NY (2016)
 Non-Objectif Sud, Inc., Tulette, France (curated by Julie Ryan) (2017)
 Water, Nailya Alexander Gallery, New York, NY (2017)
 The Color of Light, The Nailya Alexander Gallery, NYC, NY (2019)

Book covers
 Swimming From Under My Father, by Michael O'Keefe (2009)
 The Wind Blows Thru the Doors of my Heart, by Deborah Diggs-Knopf (2010)
 Skyfaring: A Journey with a Pilot, by Mark Vanhoenacker (2015 Hardcover)

Reception
Blackwood was an executive producer on the 2008 film The Duchess, which won three Academy Awards. She was also an executive producer on the film Philomena, which was nominated for four Oscars in 2013.

Since 2009, Blackwood's work as a photographer has been favorably recognized by various critics, including noted contemporary art critic, historian and curator Barbara Rose.

Personal life
Blackwood was born in Anchorage, Alaska in 1951 to Edwin and Nancy Marks.

She has one child with former spouse Anthony Mulcahy, and was married to the late documentary film director, Christian Blackwood until his death in July 1992.

Blackwood has been in a relationship with Greg Quinn since 1997 whom she married in April 2017. Blackwood and Quinn live in the Hudson Valley, in New York state where they co-own and jointly operate a blackcurrant farm.

References

External links
 
 Von Lintel Gallery
 Roberto Polo Gallery
 Official website

1951 births
Living people
Photographers from Alaska
Photographers from New York (state)
American women film producers
American women screenwriters
21st-century American women writers
People from the Hudson Valley
Rutgers University alumni
Writers from Anchorage, Alaska
American women photographers
Screenwriters from Alaska
21st-century American screenwriters